Julio Meléndez Calderón (born April 11, 1945 in Lima) is a retired Peruvian football defender.

Career
Meléndez was one of South America's most recognized defenders of his time, and was a great success in Argentine football, to the point of being considered an all-time first team member at Boca Juniors.

Meléndez played a total of 156 games for Boca in all competitions.

References

External links

 
 Appearances for Peru National Team
 

1942 births
Living people
Footballers from Lima
Association football defenders
Peruvian footballers
Peru international footballers
1975 Copa América players
Club Universitario de Deportes footballers
Sport Boys footballers
Boca Juniors footballers
Atlético Chalaco footballers
Juan Aurich footballers
Peruvian Primera División players
Argentine Primera División players
Peruvian expatriate footballers
Expatriate footballers in Argentina
Copa América-winning players
León de Huánuco managers